The Linares International Chess Tournament (Spanish: Torneo Internacional de Ajedrez Ciudad de Linares) was an annual chess tournament, usually played around the end of February, which takes its name from the city of Linares in the Jaén province of Andalusia, Spain, in which it was held. It is sometimes described as the Wimbledon of chess, being one of the strongest annual tournaments held on the de facto chess tour, along with the "Tata Steel" (Wijk aan Zee), Tal Memorial and Dortmund events.

The Linares tournament began in 1978 and was held annually from 1988 to 2010 (with the exception of 1996). Since 2010, the tournament has not been held for financial reasons.

History 
The event, sponsored by Spanish businessman Luis Rentero, was first held in 1978. At that time it was not an elite event and was won by the relatively unknown Swede Jaan Eslon, on tie-break from the Argentine Roberto Luis Debarnot). After the following year's event, it was held every other year until 1987 when no tournament took place, that being the year that Linares hosted the Candidates' Final, a match to determine a challenger for Kasparov's world title featuring Anatoly Karpov and Andrei Sokolov. The postponed 1987 event was deferred to 1988 and the tournament from that point onwards became an annual event, with the exception of 1996, when the Women's World Chess Championship was held.
Rentero was a strong opponent of short draws in chess, to the point that he offered cash bonuses for playing longer games. It's said that participants in these so-called "grand master draws" were sometimes penalised by receiving no invitation for the next year's edition.
The 1994 tournament had an average Elo rating of 2685, the highest ever at that time. The field, in eventual finishing order, consisted of Karpov, Kasparov, Shirov, Bareev, Kramnik, Lautier, Anand, Kamsky, Topalov, Ivanchuk, Gelfand, Illescas, Judit Polgár, and Beliavsky. Karpov won with an undefeated 11/13. Jeff Sonas considered Karpov's performance the best tournament result in history.
The 1994 tournament was also noted for an incident in which Garry Kasparov "took a move back" against Judit Polgár. Kasparov's fingers briefly released a knight before he realized the move was a blunder; he then moved the knight to a different square. Polgár (17 years old at the time) did not protest and the arbiter did not intervene. Kasparov went on to win the game.

In 1998, the format of the tournament changed from a single round-robin tournament to a double round-robin event (meaning that each participant plays every other participant twice, once with each colour).

Kasparov announced his retirement from chess after the 2005 tournament.

From 2006 through 2008, the first half of the tournament took place in the Mexican city of Morelia. The second half took place in Linares. Consequently, the event is sometimes referred to as Morelia-Linares.

In 2009 and 2010, the whole event took place in Linares.

The Linares tournament of 2011 was cancelled, for reasons including general economic problems. The tournament was cancelled again in 2012, with no return since.

Winners 
 1978  Jaan Eslon
 1979  Larry Christiansen
 1980 no tournament
 1981  Anatoly Karpov and  Larry Christiansen
 1982 no tournament
 1983  Boris Spassky
 1984 no tournament
 1985  Ljubomir Ljubojević and  Robert Hübner
 1986 no tournament
 1987 no tournament
 1988  Jan Timman
 1989  Vasyl Ivanchuk
 1990  Garry Kasparov
 1991  Vasyl Ivanchuk
 1992  Garry Kasparov
 1993  Garry Kasparov
 1994  Anatoly Karpov
 1995  Vasyl Ivanchuk
 1996 no tournament
 1997  Garry Kasparov
 1998  Viswanathan Anand
 1999  Garry Kasparov
 2000  Garry Kasparov and  Vladimir Kramnik
 2001  Garry Kasparov
 2002  Garry Kasparov
 2003  Peter Leko (with the same score as  Vladimir Kramnik; won on tiebreak because of more wins)
 2004  Vladimir Kramnik
 2005  Garry Kasparov (with the same score as  Veselin Topalov; won on tiebreak because of more wins with black)
 2006  Levon Aronian
 2007  Viswanathan Anand
 2008  Viswanathan Anand
 2009  Alexander Grischuk (with the same score as  Vassily Ivanchuk; won on tiebreak because of more wins)
 2010  Veselin Topalov

Only six players won the Linares Tournament multiple times: Garry Kasparov (9 wins), Vassily Ivanchuk (3), Viswanathan Anand (3), Vladimir Kramnik (2), Anatoly Karpov (2), and Larry Christiansen (2).

Full results

1970s

1978 
30 November - 8 December 1978

                              1  2  3  4  5  6  7  8  9  0
01 Jaan Eslon                *  ½  ½  ½  ½  1  1  1  0  1   6
02 Roberto Luis Debarnot     ½  *  ½  ½  1  ½  ½  ½  1  1   6
03 F. Javier Ochoa           ½  ½  *  ½  ½  ½  ½  ½  1  1   5½
04 Ángel Martín              ½  ½  ½  *  ½  0  ½  ½  1  1   5
05 Ernesto Palacios          ½  0  ½  ½  *  ½  ½  ½  1  ½   4½
08 Antonio Àngel Medina      0  ½  ½  ½  ½  ½  ½  *  ½  1   4½
07 Orestes Rodríguez         0  ½  ½  ½  ½  ½  *  ½  ½  1   4½
06 Fernando Visier           0  ½  ½  1  ½  *  ½  ½  0  1   4½
09 Oscar H. Castro Rojas     1  0  0  0  0  1  ½  ½  *  ½   3½
10 V. Pacheco                0  0  0  0  ½  0  0  0  ½  *   1
Category: V (2363)

1979 
30 November - 11 December 1979
                           1  2  3  4  5  6  7  8  9  0  1  2 
01 Larry M. Christiansen  *  0  ½  1  1  ½  1  1  ½  ½  1  1  8 
02 Viktor Korchnoi        1  *  0  1  1  ½  0  ½  ½  1  1  1  8 
03 Manuel Rivas           ½  1  *  0  0  1  ½  1  1  1  1  ½  7½ 
04 Oscar Castro           0  0  1  *  ½  ½  ½  1  1  1  1  1  7½ 
05 Jaan Eslon             0  0  1  ½  *  ½  ½  0  ½  ½  1  1  5½ 
06 Dragutin Sahovic       ½  ½  0  ½  ½  *  ½  1  ½  ½  0  ½  5 
07 Drazen Marovic         0  1  ½  ½  ½  ½  *  0  ½  ½  ½  ½  5 
08 Ricardo Calvo          0  ½  0  0  1  0  1  *  0  ½  1  1  5 
09 Evgenij Ermenkov       ½  ½  0  0  ½  ½  ½  1  *  ½  0  ½  4½ 
10 Milorad Knesevic       ½  0  0  0  ½  ½  ½  ½  ½  *  ½  ½  4 
11 Juan Manuel Bellon     0  0  0  0  0  1  ½  0  1  ½  *  ½  3½ 
12 Fernando Visier        0  0  ½  0  0  ½  ½  0  ½  ½  ½  *  3
Category: IX (2459)

1980s

1981 

Casa de la Cultura, Linares, Spain, 17–31 January 1981

                           Age Elo  1 2 3 4 5 6 7 8 9 0 1 2
 01 Anatoly Karpov         29 2690  * 1 ½ ½ ½ ½ 1 1 ½ 1 ½ 1  8
 02 Larry M. Christiansen  24 2515  0 * ½ ½ 1 ½ 1 ½ 1 1 1 1  8
 03 Bent Larsen            45 2610  ½ ½ * 0 0 1 1 ½ 1 ½ 1 1  7
 04 Zoltan Ribli           29 2585  ½ ½ 1 * ½ ½ ½ ½ 1 1 0 ½  6½
 05 Boris Spassky          43 2635  ½ 0 1 ½ * ½ ½ ½ ½ ½ 1 ½  6
 06 Lubomir Kavalek        37 2550  ½ ½ 0 ½ ½ * ½ ½ ½ ½ 1 1  6
 07 Lajos Portisch         43 2650  0 0 0 ½ ½ ½ * ½ ½ 1 1 1  5½
 08 Ljubomir Ljubojevic    30 2605  0 ½ ½ ½ ½ ½ ½ * 0 ½ 1 ½  5
 09 Svetozar Gligoric      57 2530  ½ 0 0 0 ½ ½ ½ 1 * 1 0 1  5
 10 Miguel A. Quinteros    33 2505  0 0 ½ 0 ½ ½ 0 ½ 0 * 1 1  4
 11 Juan M. Bellón         29 2415  ½ 0 0 1 0 0 0 0 1 0 * 1  3½
 12 Guillermo García       27 2520  0 0 0 ½ ½ 0 0 ½ 0 0 0 *  1½

Category: XIII (2568). Chief arbiter: IA José María González.

1983 
Casa de Cultura, Linares, Spain, 12–25 February 1983
                    Age  Elo   1  2  3  4  5  6  7  8  9  0  1
01 Boris Spassky   46  2605   *  ½  ½  ½  ½  ½  1  ½  ½  1  1  6½
02 Anatoly Karpov  31  2710   ½  *  ½  ½  ½  1  ½  ½  ½  ½  1  6
03 Ulf Andersson   31  2630   ½  ½  *  ½  ½  ½  ½  ½  ½  1  1  6
04 Artur Yusupov   23  2565   ½  ½  ½  *  ½  ½  1  ½  ½  1  0  5½
05 Anthony Miles   27  2585   ½  ½  ½  ½  *  ½  ½  0  ½  1  1  5½
06 Gyula Sax       31  2560   ½  0  ½  ½  ½  *  0  1  ½  1  1  5½
07 Jan Timman      31  2605   0  ½  ½  0  ½  1  *  1  1  ½  0  5
08 Efim Geller     57  2575   ½  ½  ½  ½  1  0  0  *  ½  ½  1  5
09 Vlastimil Hort  39  2585   ½  ½  ½  ½  ½  ½  0  ½  *  ½  1  5
10 Yasser Seirawan 22  2600   0  ½  0  0  0  0  ½  ½  ½  *  1  3
11 Bent Larsen     47  2555   0  0  0  1  0  0  1  0  0  0  *  2 

Category: XIV (2598). Chief arbiter: IA José María González.

1985 
Pabellón Julián Jiménez, Linares, Spain, 8–22 March 1985

                           Age Elo    1  2  3  4  5  6  7  8  9  0  1  2
01 Ljubomir Ljubojevic    34  2595   *  ½  ½  1  ½  0  1  1  ½  1  ½  ½   7
02 Robert Hübner          36  2605   ½  *  ½  1  ½  ½  0  ½  1  1  1  ½   7
03 Lajos Portisch         47  2635   ½  ½  *  1  ½  ½  ½  ½  ½  ½  ½  1   6½
04 Viktor Korchnoi        53  2630   0  0  0  *  ½  1  1  1  1  ½  ½  1   6½
05 Boris Spassky          48  2580   ½  ½  ½  ½  *  ½  ½  ½  ½  ½  1  ½   6
06 Jan Timman             33  2650   1  ½  ½  0  ½  *  ½  1  0  0  1  ½   5½
07 Lev Polugaevsky        50  2625   0  1  ½  0  ½  ½  *  ½  ½  1  ½  ½   5½
08 Anthony Miles          29  2570   0  ½  ½  0  ½  0  ½  *  1  ½  1  1   5½
09 Manuel Rivas           24  2480   ½  0  ½  0  ½  1  ½  0  *  ½  ½  1   5
10 Larry M. Christiansen  28  2560   0  0  ½  ½  ½  1  0  ½  ½  *  0  ½   4
11 Rafael Vaganian        33  2640   ½  0  ½  ½  0  0  ½  0  ½  1  *  ½   4
12 Andras Adorján         34  2565   ½  ½  0  0  ½  ½  ½  0  0  ½  ½  *   3½

Category: XIV (2595). Chief arbiter: Antonio Romero Briones.

1988

1989

1990s

1990 
Hotel Anibal, Linares, Spain, 18 February - 3 March 1990

               Age Elo   1 2 3 4 5 6 7 8 9 0 1 2
 01 Kasparov    26 2800  * ½ ½ 1 1 0 1 ½ 1 1 1 ½  8
 02 Gelfand     21 2615  ½ * 1 ½ 0 1 0 1 1 1 ½ 1  7½
 03 Salov       25 2645  ½ 0 * ½ 1 ½ 1 ½ ½ 1 1 ½  7
 04 Ivanchuk    20 2665  0 ½ ½ * ½ ½ ½ 1 ½ ½ 1 1  6½
 05 Short       24 2635  0 1 0 ½ * 1 ½ 1 ½ 1 0 ½  6
 06 Gulko       43 2610  1 0 ½ ½ 0 * ½ 0 ½ ½ 1 1  5½
 07 Yusupov     30 2615  0 1 0 ½ ½ ½ * ½ 1 0 ½ 1  5½
 08 Beliavsky   36 2640  ½ 0 ½ 0 0 1 ½ * 1 0 1 ½  5
 09 Spassky     53 2560  0 0 ½ ½ ½ ½ 0 0 * 1 ½ ½  4
 10 Illescas    24 2530  0 0 0 ½ 0 ½ 1 1 0 * ½ ½  4
 11 Portisch    52 2605  0 ½ 0 0 1 0 ½ 0 ½ ½ * 1  4
 12 Ljubojevic  49 2625  ½ 0 ½ 0 ½ 0 0 ½ ½ ½ 0 *  3

1991 
Hotel Anibal, Linares, Spain, 23 February - 14 March 1991

               Age Elo   1 2 3 4 5 6 7 8 9 0 1 2 3 4
 01 Ivanchuk    21 2695  * 1 ½ ½ ½ ½ ½ 1 ½ 1 1 1 ½ 1  9½
 02 Kasparov    27 2800  0 * 1 ½ ½ ½ ½ ½ 1 ½ 1 1 1 1  9
 03 Beliavsky   37 2640  ½ 0 * 1 ½ 0 1 0 0 1 1 1 1 1  8
 04 Yusupov     31 2605  ½ ½ 0 * 1 1 ½ ½ ½ 0 1 ½ ½ 1  7½
 05 Speelman    34 2610  ½ ½ ½ 0 * ½ ½ 1 ½ ½ ½ ½ 1 1  7½
 06 Salov       26 2645  ½ ½ 1 0 ½ * ½ ½ ½ 1 ½ 0 ½ 1  7
 07 Timman      39 2630  ½ ½ 0 ½ ½ ½ * ½ ½ 0 1 ½ 1 ½  6½      
 08 Karpov      39 2725  0 ½ 1 ½ 0 ½ ½ * 0 0 ½ 1 1 1  6½
 09 Ljubojevic  40 2590  ½ 0 1 ½ ½ ½ ½ 1 * ½ 0 0 1 0  6
 10 Anand       21 2635  0 ½ 0 1 ½ 0 1 1 ½ * 0 0 ½ 1  6
 11 Gurevich    32 2650  0 0 0 0 ½ ½ 0 ½ 1 1 * 1 ½ 1  6
 12 Gelfand     22 2700  0 0 0 ½ ½ 1 ½ 0 1 1 0 * 0 1  5½
 13 Ehlvest     28 2650  ½ 0 0 ½ 0 ½ 0 0 0 ½ ½ 1 * 0  3½
 14 Kamsky      16 2640  0 0 0 0 0 0 0 ½ 0 0 1 0 1 *  2½

1992 
{| class="wikitable" style="text-align:center;"
|+ X Ciudad de Linares, 23 February – 13 March 1992, Linares, Jaén, Spain, Category XVII (2659)
! !! Player !! Rating !! 1 !! 2 !! 3 !! 4 !! 5 !! 6 !! 7 !! 8 !! 9 !! 10 !! 11 !! 12 !! 13 !! 14 !! Total !! TPR !! Place
|-
|-style="background:#ccffcc;"
| 1 || align=left |  || 2780 ||  || ½ || 1 || 1 || ½ || 1 || ½ || ½ || ½ || 1 || 1 || 1 || ½ || 1 || 10 || 2861 || 1
|-
| 2 || align=left |  || 2720 || ½ ||  || ½ || ½ || ½ || 1 || 0 || ½ || ½ || 1 || 1 || ½ || 1 || ½ || 8 || 2741 || 2–3
|-
| 3 || align=left |  || 2620 || 0 || ½ ||  || 1 || 0 || ½ || 0 || 1 || 0 || 1 || 1 || 1 || 1 || 1 || 8 || 2749 || 2–3
|-
| 4 || align=left |  || 2725 || 0 || ½ || 0 ||  || ½ || ½ || 1 || 0 || 1 || ½ || 1 || 1 || ½ || 1 || 7½ || 2711 || 4
|-
| 5 || align=left |  || 2670 || ½ || ½ || 1 || ½ ||  || ½ || ½ || ½ || 1 || 0 || 1 || ½ || ½ || 0 || 7 || 2687 || 5–7
|-
| 6 || align=left |  || 2665 || 0 || 0 || ½ || ½ || ½ ||  || 1 || 1 || 0 || ½ || 1 || ½ || ½ || 1 || 7 || 2687 || 5–7
|-
| 7 || align=left |  || 2655 || ½ || 1 || 1 || 0 || ½ || 0 ||  || 0 || ½ || ½ || ½ || 1 || ½ || 1 || 7 || 2688 || 5–7
|-
| 8 || align=left |  || 2635 || ½ || ½ || 0 || 1 || ½ || 0 || 1 ||  || ½ || 1 || 0 || ½ || ½ || ½ || 6½ || 2661 || 8
|-
| 9 || align=left |  || 2620 || ½ || ½ || 1 || 0 || 0 || 1 || ½ || ½ ||  || 0 || ½ || 0 || ½ || 1 || 6 || 2633 || 9–10
|-
| 10 || align=left |  || 2655 || 0 || 0 || 0 || ½ || 1 || ½ || ½ || 0 || 1 ||  || 0 || ½ || 1 || 1 || 6 || 2630 || 9–10
|-
| 11 || align=left |  || 2555 || 0 || 0 || 0 || 0 || 0 || 0 || ½ || 1 || ½ || 1 ||  || 1 || 1 || ½ || 5½ || 2610 || 11
|-
| 12 || align=left |  || 2610 || 0 || ½ || 0 || 0 || ½ || ½ || 0 || ½ || 1 || ½ || 0 ||  || 1 || 0 || 4½ || 2553 || 12
|-
| 13 || align=left |  || 2630 || ½ || 0 || 0 || ½ || ½ || ½ || ½ || ½ || ½ || 0 || 0 || 0 ||  || ½ || 4 || 2520 || 13–14
|-
| 14 || align=left |  || 2685 || 0 || ½ || 0 || 0 || 1 || 0 || 0 || ½ || 0 || 0 || ½ || 1 || ½ ||  || 4 || 2516 || 13–14
|}

1993 
{| class="wikitable" style="text-align:center;"
|+ XI Ciudad de Linares, 23 February – 14 March 1993, Linares, Jaén, Spain, Category XVIII (2677)
! !! Player !! Rating !! 1 !! 2 !! 3 !! 4 !! 5 !! 6 !! 7 !! 8 !! 9 !! 10 !! 11 !! 12 !! 13 !! 14 !! Total !! TPR !! Place
|-
|-style="background:#ccffcc;"
| 1 || align=left |  || 2805 ||  || 1 || 1 || ½ || ½ || ½ || ½ || ½ || 1 || 1 || ½ || 1 || 1 || 1 || 10 || 2878 || 1
|-
| 2 || align=left |  || 2725 || 0 ||  || ½ || ½ || ½ || 1 || ½ || 1 || 1 || ½ || 1 || 0 || 1 || 1 || 8½ || 2783 || 2
|-
| 3 || align=left |  || 2710 || 0 || ½ ||  || ½ || ½ || ½ || 1 || 0 || 1 || 1 || ½ || 1 || 1 || 1 || 8½ || 2784 || 3
|-
| 4 || align=left |  || 2670 || ½ || ½ || ½ ||  || 1 || 0 || ½ || 0 || 1 || 1 || ½ || ½ || 1 || 1 || 8 || 2764 || 4
|-
| 5 || align=left |  || 2685 || ½ || ½ || ½ || 0 ||  || 0 || 1 || 1 || 1 || ½ || ½ || ½ || 1 || ½ || 7½ || 2733 || 5
|-
| 6 || align=left |  || 2660 || ½ || 0 || ½ || 1 || 1 ||  || 0 || ½ || ½ || 1 || ½ || ½ || ½ || 0 || 6½ || 2678 || 6–7
|-
| 7 || align=left |  || 2710 || ½ || ½ || 0 || ½ || 0 || 1 ||  || 0 || 0 || 1 || ½ || 1 || 1 || ½ || 6½ || 2674 || 6–7
|-
| 8 || align=left |  || 2610 || ½ || 0 || 1 || 1 || 0 || ½ || 1 ||  || 0 || 0 || ½ || 1 || ½ || 0 || 6 || 2653 || 8
|-
| 9 || align=left |  || 2655 || 0 || 0 || 0 || 0 || 0 || ½ || 1 || 1 ||  || ½ || 1 || 1 || 0 || ½ || 5½ || 2621 || 9–10
|-
| 10 || align=left |  || 2670 || 0 || ½ || 0 || 0 || ½ || 0 || 0 || 1 || ½ ||  || ½ || 1 || ½ || 1 || 5½ || 2620 || 9–10 
|-
| 11 || align=left |  || 2645 || ½ || 0 || ½ || ½ || ½ || ½ || ½ || ½ || 0 || ½ ||  || 0 || ½ || ½ || 5 || 2592 || 11–12
|-
| 12 || align=left |  || 2635 || 0 || 1 || 0 || ½ || ½ || ½ || 0 || 0 || 0 || 0 || 1 ||  || ½ || 1 || 5 || 2593 || 11–12
|-
| 13 || align=left |  || 2690 || 0 || 0 || 0 || 0 || 0 || ½ || 0 || ½ || 1 || ½ || ½ || ½ ||  || 1 || 4½ || 2566 || 13
|-
| 14 || align=left |  || 2605 || 0 || 0 || 0 || 0 || ½ || 1 || ½ || 1 || ½ || 0 || ½ || 0 || 0 ||  || 4 || 2541 || 14
|}

1994 

{| class="wikitable" style="text-align:center;"
|+ XII Ciudad de Linares, 23 February – 14 March 1994, Linares, Jaén, Spain, Category XVIII (2686)
! !! Player !! Rating !! 1 !! 2 !! 3 !! 4 !! 5 !! 6 !! 7 !! 8 !! 9 !! 10 !! 11 !! 12 !! 13 !! 14 !! Total !! TPR !! Place
|-
|-style="background:#ccffcc;"
| 1 || align=left |  || 2740 ||  || ½ || ½ || 1 || 1 || 1 || 1 || ½ || ½ || 1 || 1 || 1 || 1 || 1 || 11 || 2978 || 1
|-
| 2 || align=left |  || 2815 || ½ ||  || ½ || 1 || 0 || 0 || ½ || 1 || 1 || 1 || ½ || 1 || 1 || ½ || 8½ || 2786 || 2–3
|-
| 3 || align=left |  || 2715 || ½ || ½ ||  || 0 || 0 || 1 || 1 || ½ || 1 || 1 || ½ || 1 || 1 || ½ || 8½ || 2794 || 2–3
|-
| 4 || align=left |  || 2685 || 0 || 0 || 1 ||  || ½ || ½ || 1 || ½ || ½ || 1 || 0 || 1 || ½ || 1 || 7½ || 2743 || 4
|-
| 5 || align=left |  || 2625 || 0 || 1 || 1 || ½ ||  || ½ || 1 || 1 || 0 || 0 || ½ || 0 || 1 || ½ || 7 || 2720 || 5–6
|-
| 6 || align=left |  || 2710 || 0 || 1 || 0 || ½ || ½ ||  || 0 || ½ || ½ || ½ || ½ || 1 || 1 || 1 || 7 || 2713 || 5–6 
|-
| 7 || align=left |  || 2640 || 0 || ½ || 0 || 0 || 0 || 1 ||  || 1 || ½ || 1 || 1 || ½ || 0 || 1 || 6½ || 2690 || 7–9
|-
| 8 || align=left |  || 2715 || ½ || 0 || ½ || ½ || 0 || ½ || 0 ||  || 1 || 0 || ½ || 1 || 1 || 1 || 6½ || 2684 || 7–9
|-
| 9 || align=left |  || 2695 || ½ || 0 || 0 || ½ || 1 || ½ || ½ || 0 ||  || ½ || ½ || 1 || ½ || 1 || 6½ || 2685 || 7–9
|-
| 10 || align=left |  || 2710 || 0 || 0 || 0 || 0 || 1 || ½ || 0 || 1 || ½ ||  || ½ || 1 || ½ || 1 || 6 || 2655 || 10 
|-
| 11 || align=left |  || 2685 || 0 || ½ || ½ || 1 || ½ || ½ || 0 || ½ || ½ || ½ ||  || 0 || ½ || ½ || 5½ || 2629 || 11
|-
| 12 || align=left |  || 2590 || 0 || 0 || 0 || 0 || 1 || 0 || ½ || 0 || 0 || 0 || 1 ||  || 1 || 1 || 4½ || 2583 || 12
|-
| 13 || align=left |  || 2630 || 0 || 0 || 0 || ½ || 0 || 0 || 1 || 0 || ½ || ½ || ½ || 0 ||  || 1 || 4 || 2549 || 13
|-
| 14 || align=left |  || 2650 || 0 || ½ || ½ || 0 || ½ || 0 || 0 || 0 || 0 || 0 || ½ || 0 || 0 ||  || 2 || 2393 || 14
|}

1995 

{| class="wikitable" style="text-align:center;"
|+ XIII Ciudad de Linares, 1 – 18 March 1995, Linares, Jaén, Spain, Category XVII (2654)
! !! Player !! Rating !! 1 !! 2 !! 3 !! 4 !! 5 !! 6 !! 7 !! 8 !! 9 !! 10 !! 11 !! 12 !! 13 !! 14 !! Total !! TPR !! Place
|-
|-style="background:#ccffcc;"
| 1 || align=left |  || 2700 || || ½ || ½ || 1 || ½ || 1 || 1 || ½ || ½ || 1 || ½ || 1 || 1 || 1 || 10 || 2861 || 1
|-
| 2 || align=left |  || 2765 || ½ ||  || ½ || 1 || 1 || ½ || ½ || ½ || 1 || ½ || 1 || ½ || 1 || ½ || 9 || 2786 || 2
|-
| 3 || align=left |  || 2710 || ½ || ½ ||  || 1 || ½ || ½ || ½ || ½ || 1 || ½ || ½ || ½ || ½ || 1 || 8 || 2736 || 3–4
|-
| 4 || align=left |  || 2630 || 0 || 0 || 0 ||  || ½ || 1 || ½ || 1 || 1 || 1 || 1 || ½ || ½ || 1 || 8 || 2742 || 3–4
|-
| 5 || align=left |  || 2635 || ½ || 0 || ½ || ½ ||  || 1 || 1 || ½ || ½ || 0 || ½ || ½ || 1 || 1 || 7½ || 2712 || 5
|-
| 6 || align=left |  || 2650 || 0 || ½ || ½ || 0 || 0 ||  || 1 || ½ || ½ || ½ || 1 || ½ || 1 || 1 || 7 || 2682 || 6
|-
| 7 || align=left |  || 2625 || 0 || ½ || ½ || ½ || 0 || 0 ||  || 1 || ½ || ½ || 1 || ½ || ½ || ½ || 6 || 2626 || 7–8
|-
| 8 || align=left |  || 2595 || ½ || ½ || ½ || 0 || ½ || ½ || 0 ||  || 0 || ½ || 1 || ½ || 1 || ½ || 6 || 2629 || 7–8
|-
| 9 || align=left |  || 2645 || ½ || 0 || 0 || 0 || ½ || ½ || ½ || 1 ||  || ½ || ½ || 1 || 0 || ½ || 5½ || 2597 || 9–10
|-
| 10 || align=left |  || 2650 || 0 || ½ || ½ || 0 || 1 || ½ || ½ || ½ || ½ ||  || 0 || ½ || 0 || 1 || 5½ || 2596 || 9–10
|-
| 11 || align=left |  || 2655 || ½ || 0 || ½ || 0 || ½ || 0 || 0 || 0 || ½ || 1 ||  || 1 || ½ || ½ || 5 || 2566 || 11–12
|-
| 12 || align=left |  || 2580 || 0 || ½ || ½ || ½ || ½ || ½ || ½ || ½ || 0 || ½ || 0 ||  || ½ || ½ || 5 || 2572 || 11–12
|-
| 13 || align=left |  || 2655 || 0 || 0 || ½ || ½ || 0 || 0 || ½ || 0 || 1 || 1 || ½ || ½ ||  || 0 || 4½ || 2543 || 13
|-
| 14 || align=left |  || 2655 || 0 || ½ || 0 || 0 || 0 || 0 || ½ || ½ || ½ || 0 || ½ || ½ || 1 ||  || 4 || 2512 || 14
|}

1997 

{| class="wikitable" style="text-align:center;"
|+ XIV Ciudad de Linares, 4 – 16 February 1997, Linares, Jaén, Spain, Category XIX (2701)
! !! Player !! Rating !! 1 !! 2 !! 3 !! 4 !! 5 !! 6 !! 7 !! 8 !! 9 !! 10 !! 11 !! 12 !! Total !! TPR !! Place
|-
|-style="background:#ccffcc;"
| 1 || align=left |  || 2795 ||  || 1 || 1 || 1 || 1 || 1 || ½ || 0 || 1 || ½ || 1 || ½ || 8½ || 2903 || 1
|-
| 2 || align=left |  || 2740 || 0 ||  || ½ || 1 || 1 || ½ || ½ || 1 || ½ || 1 || ½ || 1 || 7½ || 2830 || 2
|-
| 3 || align=left |  || 2665 || 0 || ½ ||  || ½ || ½ || ½ || 1 || ½ || ½ || 1 || 1 || ½ || 6½ || 2769 || 3–4
|-
| 4 || align=left |  || 2725 || 0 || 0 || ½ ||  || ½ || ½ || 1 || 1 || 1 || 1 || 0 || 1 || 6½ || 2763 || 3–4
|-
| 5 || align=left |  || 2645 || 0 || 0 || ½ || ½ ||  || 0 || ½ || 1 || 1 || 1 || ½ || 1 || 6 || 2741 || 5
|-
| 6 || align=left |  || 2765 || 0 || ½ || ½ || ½ || 1 ||  || ½ || ½ || 0 || 1 || ½ || ½ || 5½ || 2695 || 6
|-
| 7 || align=left |  || 2700 || ½ || ½ || 0 || 0 || ½ || ½ ||  || ½ || 1 || ½ || ½ || ½ || 5 || 2664 || 7–8
|-
| 8 || align=left |  || 2740 || 1 || 0 || ½ || 0 || 0 || ½ || ½ ||  || ½ || 0 || 1 || 1 || 5 || 2661 || 7–8
|-
| 9 || align=left |  || 2655 || 0 || ½ || ½ || 0 || 0 || 1 || 0 || ½ ||  || ½ || 1 || ½ || 4½ || 2640 || 9
|-
| 10 || align=left |  || 2650 || ½ || 0 || 0 || 0 || 0 || 0 || ½ || 1 || ½ ||  || ½ || 1 || 4 || 2603 || 10
|-
| 11 || align=left |  || 2690 || 0 || ½ || 0 || 1 || ½ || ½ || ½ || 0 || 0 || ½ ||  || 0 || 3½ || 2568 || 11–12
|-
| 12 || align=left |  || 2640 || ½ || 0 || ½ || 0 || 0 || ½ || ½ || 0 || ½ || 0 || 1 ||  || 3½ || 2573 || 11–12
|}

1998 
Final Results of 1998:

{| class="wikitable" style="text-align:center;"
|+ XV Ciudad de Linares, 22 February – 9 March 1998, Linares, Jaén, Spain, Category XXI (2752)
! !! Player !! Rating !! 1 !! 2 !! 3 !! 4 !! 5 !! 6 !! 7 !! Total !! TPR !! Place
|-
|-style="background:#ccffcc;"
| 1 || align=left |  || 2770 || || 1 ½ || ½ ½ || 0 ½ || 1 ½ || ½ 1 || ½ 1 || 7½ || 2844 || 1
|-  
| 2 || align=left |  || 2710 || 0 ½ ||  || ½ 1 || ½ ½ || 1 0 || 1 0 || 1 1 || 7 || 2816 || 2
|-
| 3 || align=left |  || 2790 || ½ ½ || ½ 0 ||  || ½ ½ || ½ 1 || ½ ½ || 1 ½ || 6½ || 2774 ||3–4
|-
| 4 || align=left |  || 2825 || 1 ½ || ½ ½ || ½ ½ ||  || ½ ½ || ½ ½ || ½ ½ || 6½ || 2769 || 3–4
|-
| 5 || align=left |  || 2690 || 0 ½ || 0 1 || ½ 0 || ½ ½ ||  || 1 0 || ½ 1 || 5½ || 2733 || 5
|-
| 6 || align=left |  || 2740 || ½ 0 || 0 1 || ½ ½ || ½ ½ || 0 1 ||  || 0 ½ || 5 || 2697 || 6
|-
| 7 || align=left |  || 2740 || ½ 0 || 0 0 || 0 ½ || ½ ½ || ½ 0 || 1 ½ ||  || 4 || 2629 || 7
|}

1999 
Final Results of 1999:

{| class="wikitable" style="text-align:center;"
|+ XVI Ciudad de Linares, 21 February – 10 March 1999, Linares, Jaén, Spain, Category XX (2735)
! !! Player !! Rating !! 1 !! 2 !! 3 !! 4 !! 5 !! 6 !! 7 !! 8 !! Total !! Wins !! TPR
|-
|-style="background:#ccffcc;"
| 1 || align=left |  || 2812 ||  || ½ 1 || ½ ½ || ½ ½ || 1 1 || 1 ½ || ½ 1 || 1 1  || 10½ || || 2817
|-
| 2 || align=left |  || 2781 || ½ 0 ||  || ½ ½ || ½ ½ || ½ ½ || ½ 1 || 1 ½ || ½ 1 || 8 || 3 || 2778
|-
| 3 || align=left |  || 2751 || ½ ½ || ½ ½ ||  || ½ ½ || ½ ½ || ½ ½ || ½ 1 || 1 ½ || 8 || 2 || 2782
|-
| 4 || align=left |  || 2694 || ½ ½ || ½ ½ || ½ ½ ||  || 1 ½ || ½ ½ || 0 ½ || 0 ½ || 6½ || || 2712
|-
| 5 || align=left |  || 2714 || 0 0 || ½ ½ || ½ ½ || 0 ½ ||  || ½ 1 || 1 ½ || 0 ½ || 6 || 2 || 2688
|-
| 6 || align=left |  || 2700 || 0 ½ || ½ 0 || ½ ½ || ½ ½ || ½ 0 ||  || ½ 1 || ½ ½ || 6 || 1 || 2690
|-
| 7 || align=left |  || 2713 || ½ 0 || 0 ½ || ½ 0 || 1 ½ || 0 ½ || ½ 0 ||  || ½ 1 || 5½ || 2 || 2658
|-
| 8 || align=left |  || 2716 || 0 0 || ½ 0 || 0 ½ || 1 ½ || 1 ½ || ½ ½ || ½ 0 ||  || 5½ || 2 || 2657
|}

2000s

2000 
FIDE World Champion Alexander Khalifman was a late replacement for Alexander Morozevich.

Final Results of 2000:

{| class="wikitable" style="text-align:center;"
|+ XVII SuperGM Linares, 28 February – 10 March 2000, Linares, Jaén, Spain, Category XXI (2752)
! !! Player !! Rating !! 1 !! 2 !! 3 !! 4 !! 5 !! 6 !! Total !! Wins !!  !! TPR
|-
|-style="background:#ccffcc;"
| 1-2 || align=left |  || 2851
|  || ½ ½ || 1 ½ || 1 ½ || ½ ½ || ½ ½ || 6 || 2 || 1 || 2803
|-
|-style="background:#ccffcc;"
| 1-2 || align=left |  || 2758
| ½ ½ ||  || 1 ½ || ½ ½ || 1 ½ || ½ ½ || 6 || 2 || 1 || 2822
|-
| 3 || align=left |  || 2751
| 0 ½ || 0 ½ ||  || 1 ½ || ½ ½ || ½ ½ || 4½ || 1 || 1 || 2715
|-
| 4 || align=left |  || 2769
| 0 ½ || ½ ½ || 0 ½ ||  || ½ 1 || ½ ½ || 4½ || 1 || 0 || 2712
|-
| 5 || align=left |  || 2656
| ½ ½ || 0 ½ || ½ ½ || ½ 0 ||  || ½ 1 || 4½ || 1 || 0 || 2734
|-
| 6 || align=left |  || 2725
| ½ ½ || ½ ½ || ½ ½ || ½ ½ || ½ 0 ||  || 4½ || 0 || || 2721
|}

2001 
Final Results of 2001:

{| class="wikitable" style="text-align:center;"
|+ XVIII SuperGM Linares, 23 February – 6 March 2001, Linares, Jaén, Spain, Category XX (2722)
! !! Player !! Rating !! 1 !! 2 !! 3 !! 4 !! 5 !! 6 !! Total !! Wins !! TPR
|-
|-style="background:#ccffcc;"
| 1 || align=left |  || 2849
|  || ½ 1 || 1 1 || ½ ½ || ½ 1 || ½ 1 || 7½ || || 2889
|-
| 2 || align=left |  || 2718
| ½ 0 ||  || 1 0 || 0 1 || ½ ½ || ½ ½ || 4½ || 2 || 2686
|-
| 3 || align=left |  || 2663
| 0 0 || 0 1 ||   || ½ ½ || ½ 1 || ½ ½ || 4½ || 2 || 2697
|-
| 4 || align=left |  || 2676
| ½ ½ || 1 0 || ½ ½ ||   || ½ 0  || ½ ½ || 4½ || 1 || 2694
|-
| 5 || align=left |  || 2679
| ½ 0 || ½ ½ || ½ 0 || ½ 1 ||  || ½ ½ || 4½ || 1 || 2694
|-
| 6 || align=left |  || 2745
| ½ 0 || ½ ½ || ½ ½ || ½ ½ || ½ ½ ||  || 4½ || 0 || 2681
|}

2002 
Final Results of 2002:

{| class="wikitable" style="text-align:center;"
|+ XIX SuperGM Linares, 22 February – 10 March 2002, Linares, Jaén, Spain, Category XX (2732)
! !! Player !! Rating !! 1 !! 2 !! 3 !! 4 !! 5 !! 6 !! 7 !! Total !! TPR
|-
|-style="background:#ccffcc;"
| 1 || align=left |  || 2838 ||  || ½ 1 || ½ ½ || ½ ½ || 1 ½ || ½ 1 || ½ 1 || 8 || 2839
|-
| 2 || align=left |  || 2727 || ½ 0 ||  || 1 ½ || ½ ½ || 0 1 || ½ 1 || ½ ½ || 6½ || 2762
|-
| 3 || align=left |  || 2717 || ½ ½ || 0 ½ ||  || ½ ½ || 1 ½ || ½ 1 || ½ 0 || 6 || 2734
|-
| 4 || align=left |  || 2757 || ½ ½ || ½ ½ || ½ ½ ||  || 0 ½ || ½ ½ || ½ 1 || 6 || 2728
|-
| 5 || align=left |  || 2742 || 0 ½ || 1 0 || 0 ½ || 1 ½ ||  || ½ ½ || ½ 1 || 6 || 2730
|-
| 6 || align=left |  || 2629 || ½ 0 || ½ 0 || ½ 0 || ½ ½ || ½ ½ ||  || ½ 1 || 5 || 2692
|-
| 7 || align=left |  || 2715 || ½ 0 || ½ ½ || ½ 1 || ½ 0 || ½ 0 || ½ 0 ||  || 4½ || 2648
|}

2003 
Final Results of 2003:

{| class="wikitable" style="text-align:center;"
|+ XX Ciudad de Linares, 22 February – 9 March 2003, Linares, Jaén, Spain, Category XX (2733)
! !! Player !! Rating !! 1 !! 2 !! 3 !! 4 !! 5 !! 6 !! 7 !! Total !! Wins !! TPR
|-
|-style="background:#ccffcc;"
| 1 || align=left |  || 2736 || || ½ ½ || 0 1 || ½ ½ || ½ ½ || 1 0 || 1 1 || 7 || 4 || 2790
|-
| 2 || align=left |  || 2809 || ½ ½ ||  || ½ ½ || ½ ½ || 1 ½ || ½ ½ || 1 ½ || 7 || 2 || 2778
|-
| 3 || align=left |  || 2753 || 1 0 || ½ ½ ||  || 0 ½ || 1 ½ || ½ ½ || ½ 1 || 6½ || 3 ||2759
|-
| 4 || align=left |  || 2847 || ½ ½ || ½ ½ || 1 ½ ||  || 1 ½ || ½ ½ || 0 ½ || 6½ || 2 || 2743
|-
| 5 || align=left |  || 2734 || ½ ½ || 0 ½ || 0 ½ || 0 ½ ||  || 1 1 || ½ ½ || 5½ || || 2704
|-
| 6 || align=left |  || 2629 || 0 1 || ½ ½ || ½ ½ || ½ ½ || 0 0 ||  || ½ ½ || 5 || || 2694
|-
| 7 || align=left |  || 2624 || 0 0 || 0 ½ || ½ 0 || 1 ½ || ½ ½ || ½ ½ ||  || 4½ || || 2664
|}

2004 
Final Results of 2004:

{| class="wikitable" style="text-align:center;"
|+ XXI SuperGM Linares, 19 February – 5 March 2004, Linares, Jaén, Spain, Category XX (2731)
! !! Player !! Rating !! 1 !! 2 !! 3 !! 4 !! 5 !! 6 !! 7 !! Total !! Wins !! TPR
|-
|-style="background:#ccffcc;"
| 1 || align=left |  || 2777 ||  || ½ 1 || ½ ½ || ½ ½ || 1 ½ || ½ ½ || ½ ½ || 7 || || 2780
|-
| 2 || align=left |  || 2722 || ½ 0 ||  || ½ ½ || 1 ½ || ½ ½ || 1 ½ || ½ ½ || 6½ || 2 || 2762
|-
| 3 || align=left |  || 2831 || ½ ½ || ½ ½ ||  || ½ ½ || ½ ½ || ½ ½ || 1 ½ || 6½ || 1 || 2743
|-
| 4 || align=left |  || 2656 || ½ ½ || 0 ½ || ½ ½ ||  || ½ ½ || 0 1 || ½ 1 || 6 || 2 || 2744
|-
| 5 || align=left |  || 2735 || 0 ½ || ½ ½ || ½ ½ || ½ ½ ||  || ½ 1 || ½ ½ || 6 || 1 || 2730
|-
| 6 || align=left |  || 2736 || ½ ½ || 0 ½ || ½ ½ || 1 0 || ½ 0 ||  || ½ ½ || 5 || 1 || 2673
|-
| 7 || align=left |  || 2663 || ½ ½ || ½ ½ || 0 ½ || ½ 0 || ½ ½ || ½ ½ ||  || 5 || 0 || 2685
|}

2005 
Final Results of 2005:

{| class="wikitable" style="text-align:center;"
|+ XXII SuperGM Linares, 23 February – 17 March 2005, Linares, Jaén, Spain, Category XX (2743)
! !! Player !! Rating !! 1 !! 2 !! 3 !! 4 !! 5 !! 6 !! 7 !! Total !! Wins !!  !! TPR
|-
|-style="background:#ccffcc;"
| 1 || align=left |  || 2804 ||  || ½ 0 || ½ ½ || ½ ½ || 1 1 || 1 1 || ½ 1 || 8 || 5 || 3 || 2857
|-
| 2 || align=left |  || 2757 || ½ 1 ||  || 0 ½ || ½ ½ || 1 ½ || 1 1 || ½ 1 || 8 || 5 || 1 || 2865
|-
| 3 || align=left |  || 2786 || ½ ½ || 1 ½ ||  || ½ ½ || ½ 0 || ½ ½ || ½ 1 || 6½ || || || 2764
|-
| 4 || align=left |  || 2749 || ½ ½ || ½ ½ || ½ ½ ||  || ½ ½ || ½ ½ || ½ ½ || 6 || || || 2742
|-
| 5 || align=left |  || 2741 || 0 0 || 0 ½ || ½ 1 || ½ ½ ||  || 1 ½ || ½ ½ || 5½ || || || 2714
|-
| 6 || align=left |  || 2686 || 0 0 || 0 0 || ½ ½ || ½ ½ || 0 ½ ||  || ½ 1 || 4 || 1 || || 2627
|-
| 7 || align=left |  || 2678 || ½ 0 || ½ 0 || ½ 0 || ½ ½ || ½ ½ || ½ 0 ||  || 4 || 0 || || 2628
|}

2006 

{| class="wikitable" style="text-align:center;"
|+ XXIII SuperGM Morelia/Linares, 18 February – 11 March 2006, Morelia – Linares, Category XX (2732)
! !! Player !! Rating !! 1 !! 2 !! 3 !! 4 !! 5 !! 6 !! 7 !! 8 !! Total !! TPR
|-
|-style="background:#ccffcc;"
| 1 || align=left |  || 2752
|  || 1 ½ || ½ 0 || ½ 1 || 0 ½ || 1 ½ || 1 ½ || ½ 1 || 8½ || 2808
|-
| 2 || align=left |  || 2700
| 0 ½ ||  || 1 ½ || 0 ½ || ½ 1 || ½ 1 || 1 ½ || ½ ½ || 8 || 2786
|-
| 3 || align=left |  || 2801
| ½ 1 || 0 ½ ||  || ½ 1 || 1 ½ || 0 1 || ½ 1 || 0 ½ || 8 || 2771
|-
| 4 || align=left |  || 2740
| ½ 0 || 1 ½ || ½ 0 ||  || 1 ½ || ½ ½ || ½ ½ || 1 ½ || 7½ || 2759
|-
| 5 || align=left |  || 2729
| 1 ½ || ½ 0 || 0 ½ || 0 ½ ||  || 1 ½ ||  ½ 0 || ½ 1 || 6½ || 2703
|-
| 6 || align=left |  || 2765
| 0 ½ || 0 ½ || 1 0 || ½ ½ || 0 ½ ||  || 1 ½ || 1 ½ || 6½ || 2698
|-
| 7 || align=left |  || 2717
| 0 ½ || 0 ½ || ½ 0 || ½ ½ || ½ 1 || 0 ½ ||  || ½ 1 || 6 || 2683
|-
| 8 || align=left |  || 2650
| ½ 0 || ½ ½ || 1 ½ || 0 ½ || ½ 0 || 0 ½ || ½ 0 ||  || 5 || 2641
|}

2007 

{| class="wikitable" style="text-align:center;"
|+ XXIV SuperGM Morelia/Linares, 17 February – 10 March 2007, Morelia – Linares, Category XX (2746)
! !! Player !! Rating !! 1 !! 2 !! 3 !! 4 !! 5 !! 6 !! 7 !! 8 !! Total !! TPR
|-
|-style="background:#ccffcc;"
| 1 || align=left |  || 2779
|  || 1 1 || 1 ½ || 0 ½ || ½ ½ || ½ ½ || ½ ½ || 1 ½ || 8½ || 2820
|-
| 2 || align=left |  || 2690
| 0 0 ||  || 1 ½ || ½ ½ || ½ ½ || 1 1 || 1 ½ || ½ 0 || 7½ || 2782
|-
| 3 || align=left |  || 2741
| 0 ½ || 0 ½ ||  || ½ ½ || ½ 1 || ½ 1 || 0 1 || ½ 1 || 7½ || 2775
|-
| 4 || align=left |  || 2744
| 1 ½ || ½ ½ || ½ ½ ||  || ½ ½ || 0 ½ || ½ ½ || ½ ½ || 7 || 2745
|-
| 5 || align=left |  || 2728
| ½ ½ || ½ ½ || ½ 0 || ½ ½ ||  || ½ ½ ||  ½ ½ || ½ 1 || 7 || 2748
|-
| 6 || align=left |  || 2750
| ½ ½ || 0 0 || ½ 0 || 1 ½ || ½ ½ ||  || 1 ½ || ½ ½ || 6½ || 2715
|-
| 7 || align=left |  || 2783
| ½ ½ || 0 ½ || 1 0 || ½ ½ || ½ ½ || 0 ½ ||  || ½ ½ || 6 || 2690
|-
| 8 || align=left |  || 2749
| 0 ½ || ½ 1 || ½ 0 || ½ ½ || ½ 0 || ½ ½ || ½ ½ ||  || 6 || 2695
|}

2008 
{| class="wikitable" style="text-align:center;"
|+ XXV SuperGM Morelia/Linares, 15 February – 7 March 2008, Morelia – Linares, Cat. XXI (2756)
! !! Player !! Rating !! 1 !! 2 !! 3 !! 4 !! 5 !! 6 !! 7 !! 8 !! Total !! TPR 
|-
|-style="background:#ccffcc;"
| 1 || align=left |  || 2799
|  || 1 ½ || ½ ½ || 0 ½ || ½ ½ || ½ ½ || 1 ½ || 1 1 || 8½ || 2829
|-
| 2 || align=left |  || 2733
| 0 ½ ||  || 1 1 || 1 ½ || 0 ½ || ½ 1 || ½ 0 || ½ 1 || 8 || 2808
|-
| 3 || align=left |  || 2780
| ½ ½ || 0 0 ||  || 1 0 || ½ ½ || 1 ½ || 1 1 || 0 1 || 7½ || 2781
|-
| 4 || align=left |  || 2739
| 1 ½ || 0 ½ || 0 1 ||  || ½ ½ || 1 ½ || ½ ½ || ½ ½ || 7½ || 2787
|-
| 5 || align=left |  || 2735
| ½ ½ || 1 ½ || ½ ½ || ½ ½ ||  || ½ ½ || 0 ½ || 0 1 || 7 || 2758
|-
| 6 || align=left |  || 2751
| ½ ½ || ½ 0 || 0 ½ || 0 ½ || ½ ½ ||  || 1 1 || ½ ½ || 6½ || 2727
|-
| 7 || align=left |  || 2753
| 0 ½ || ½ 1 || 0 0 || ½ ½ || 1 ½ || 0 0 ||  || ½ ½ || 5½ || 2676
|-
| 8 || align=left |  || 2755
| 0 0 || ½ 0 || 1 0 || ½ ½ || 1 0 || ½ ½ || ½ ½ ||  || 5½ || 2675
|}

 GM Alejandro Ramírez (2509) won the III Morelia Open tournament.

2009 
{| class="wikitable" style="text-align:center;"
|+ XXVI Ciudad de Linares, 19 February – 7 March 2009, Linares, Jaén, Spain, Category XXI (2756)
! !! Player !! Rating !! 1 !! 2 !! 3 !! 4 !! 5 !! 6 !! 7 !! 8 !! Total !! Wins !! TPR
|-
|-style="background:#ccffcc;"
| 1 || align=left |  || 2733
|  || ½ ½ || ½ 0 || ½ ½ || 1 ½ || 1 ½ || 1 ½ || ½ ½ || 8 || 3 || 2809
|-
| 2 || align=left |  || 2779
| ½ ½ ||  || ½ ½ || ½ ½ || ½ ½ || ½ ½ || 1 1 || ½ ½ || 8 || 2 || 2802
|-
| 3 || align=left |  || 2776
| ½ 1 || ½ ½ ||  || 1 ½ || ½ ½ || ½ 0 || ½ 0 || ½ 1 || 7½ || || 2781
|-
| 4 || align=left |  || 2791
| ½ ½ || ½ ½ || 0 ½ ||  || 1 ½ || 1 ½ || 0 ½ || ½ ½ || 7 || || 2750
|-
| 5 || align=left |  || 2761
| 0 ½ || ½ ½ || ½ ½ || 0 ½ ||  || ½ ½ || ½ 1 || ½ ½ || 6½ || || 2726
|-
| 6 || align=left |  || 2739
| 0 ½ || ½ ½ || ½ 1 || 0 ½ || ½ ½ ||  || ½ ½ || ½ ½ || 6½ || || 2729
|-
| 7 || align=left |  || 2750
| 0 ½ || 0 0 || ½ 1 || 1 ½ || ½ 0 || ½ ½ ||  || 1 ½ || 6½ || || 2727
|-
| 8 || align=left |  || 2717
| ½ ½ || ½ ½ || ½ 0 || ½ ½ || ½ ½ || ½ ½ || 0 ½ ||  || 6 || || 2711
|}

2010 
{| class="wikitable" style="text-align:center;"
|+ XXVII Ciudad de Linares, 13–24 February 2010, Linares, Jaén, Spain, Category XXI (2758)
! !! Player !! Rating !! 1 !! 2 !! 3 !! 4 !! 5 !! 6 !! Total !! TB !! TPR
|-
|-style="background:#ccffcc;"
| 1 || align=left |  || 2805
|  || 1 0 || ½ ½ || 1 ½ || ½ 1 || ½ 1 || 6½ || || 2858
|-
| 2 || align=left |  || 2736
| 0 1 ||  || ½ ½ || ½ 1 || 1 ½ || ½ ½ || 6 || || 2834
|-
| 3 || align=left |  || 2781
| ½ ½ || ½ ½ ||  || ½ 1 || ½ ½ || ½ ½ || 5½ || || 2789
|-
| 4 || align=left |  || 2759
| 0 ½ || ½ 0 || ½ 0 ||  || ½ ½ || 1 ½ || 4 || 2.5 || 2685
|-
| 5 || align=left |  || 2761
| ½ 0 || 0 ½ || ½ ½ || ½ ½ ||  || ½ ½ || 4 || 2.0 || 2685
|-
| 6 || align=left |  || 2705
| ½ 0 || ½ ½ || ½ ½ || 0 ½ || ½ ½ ||  || 4 || 1.5 || 2696
|}

References

External links 
 
   – a brief history and news of the 2008 event.
  – winners, crosstables from 1990–2006.
 Chess Tournaments at Linares at Chessgames.com

Chess competitions
Chess in Spain
Chess in Mexico
1978 in chess
Recurring sporting events established in 1978